is a town in Kasuya District, Fukuoka Prefecture, Japan.

As of 2016, the town has an estimated population of 31,213 and a population density of 800 persons per km2. The total area is 38.90 km2.

The center of Sasaguri is directly south of Narufuchi Dam.

The town is known for its  reclining Buddha statue at Nanzo-in, considered one of the largest bronze statues in the world. Nanzo-in is the initial temple on the 88-temple Sasaguri pilgrimage route.

The town jointly manages the 17-hectare Sasaguri Kyudai Forest with Kyushu University.

References

External links

  

Towns in Fukuoka Prefecture